The Castle Rock Depot is a historic Denver & Rio Grande Railway train station, now the Castle Rock Museum and located at 420 Elbert St. in Castle Rock, Colorado.

History 
The depot was built in 1875; it was moved in 1970 a few blocks from its original location. It was listed on the National Register of Historic Places in 1974.

It was built by Benjamin Hammar (interred in the Castle Rock cemetery), who also built the original Denver Union Terminal in downtown Denver.

The museum includes original ink and watercolor architectural drawings by the unknown architect of the building.

It has elements of Victorian style and was built of rhyolite stone from Castle Rock quarries.  It is "one of Colorado's older original buildings".  It is a "rare example of a stone depot constructed by the Denver & Rio Grande Railroad."

It is a one-and-a-half-story building,  in plan.

References

External links

Transportation museums in Colorado
National Register of Historic Places in Douglas County, Colorado
Buildings and structures completed in 1875
Railway stations in Colorado